Evgeny Alexandrovich Orlov (born October 24, 1990) is a Russian professional ice hockey forward who currently plays for HC Yugra of the Kontinental Hockey League.

External links

1990 births
Living people
Amur Khabarovsk players
Avangard Omsk players
Zauralie Kurgan players
HC Yugra players
Russian ice hockey forwards